The House of Maktoum is the ruling royal family of the Emirate of Dubai, and one of the six ruling families of the United Arab Emirates. The family is a branch of the Bani Yas clan (a lineage the family shares with the Al Nahyan dynasty of Abu Dhabi), which is a branch of the Al Bu Falasah section of the Bani Yas, a tribal federation that was the dominant power through the region that now forms the United Arab Emirates.

History

In 1833, about 800 members of the Bani Yas tribe, under the leadership of Maktoum bin Butti, took over the emirate of Dubai and established the Al Maktoum dynasty in the emirate. 

The Al Maktoum dynasty has ruled Dubai since 1833. Within the federation of the United Arab Emirates, a member of the Dubai ruling family is also de facto always the country's Vice President, Prime Minister and Defence Minister.

Family tree

The following Al Maktoum family members have ruled Dubai:

 9 July 1833 – 1836 Sheikh Obeid bin Said bin Rashid (d. 1836)
 9 July 1833 – 1852 Sheikh Maktoum bin Butti bin Suhail (d. 1852)
 1852 – 1859 Sheikh Saeed bin Butti (d. 1859)
 1859 – 22 November 1886 Sheikh Hasher bin Maktoum (d. 1886)
 22 November 1886 – 7 April 1894 Sheikh Rashid bin Maktoum (d. 1894)
 7 April 1894 – 16 February 1906 Sheikh Maktoum bin Hasher Al Maktoum (d. 1906)
 16 February 1906 – November 1912 Sheikh Butti bin Suhail Al Maktoum (d. 1912)
 November 1912 – September 1958 Sheikh Saeed bin Maktoum bin Hasher Al Maktoum (d. 1958)
 September 1958 – 7 October 1990 Sheikh Rashid bin Saeed Al Maktoum (d. 1990)
 7 October 1990 – 4 January 2006 Sheikh Maktoum bin Rashid Al Maktoum (d. 2006)
 4 January 2006 - current  Sheikh Mohammed bin Rashid Al Maktoum

Assets
The Al Maktoum family owns Godolphin, one of the premier thoroughbred studs.

Controversy

Shamsa bint Mohammed Al Maktoum has alleged that she was kidnapped off the streets of Cambridge by her father Sheikh Mohammed bin Rashid al-Maktoum’s men. Latifa bint Mohammed Al Maktoum has also alleged that she was kidnapped and tortured on the orders of her father. The actions taken against the princesses was allegedly motivated by a desire to protect the reputation of the Al Maktoum family.

On 29 June 2019, The Sun reported that the wife of Sheikh Mohammed bin Rashid al Maktoum, Princess Haya bint Al Hussein, had fled Dubai and was in Germany seeking political asylum along with her children, a son and a daughter. The cause of the departure was unknown, despite a poem alluding to betrayal. On 30 July 2019 at the High Court, she filed for the sole custody of their two children, for a forced marriage protection order (FMPO), a non-molestation order, and non-repatriation to Dubai.

In December 2019, a UK family court ruled that—on the balance of probabilities—Sheikh Mohammed had orchestrated the abductions of Sheikha Latifa and Sheikha Shamsa and that he continued to maintain a regime whereby both were deprived of their liberty. Also on the balance of probabilities, that he had subjected his former wife, Princess Haya, to a campaign of "intimidation"; the findings were published in March 2020.

See also
Bani Hareth
Banu Yam
Banu Thaqif
Al Saud
Liwa Oasis
House of Al-Falasi

Notes

Maktoum family
Tribes of the United Arab Emirates
Arab dynasties